Mike Schroepfer is an entrepreneur, technical architect and manager who was the chief technology officer (CTO) at Meta Platforms between March 2013 and March 2022.

Education
Schroepfer attended Spanish River Community High School in Palm Beach County, Florida, graduating in 1993. He holds a bachelor's degree (1997) and a master's degree (1999) in computer science from Stanford University.

Career 
He was an engineer at computer software company Puffin Designs from October 1997 to November 1999 when he became a partner in Reactivity, Inc., a computer software consulting practice.

Schroepfer founded the computer software company CenterRun in June 2000, becoming its Chief Architect and Director of Engineering. CenterRun was acquired by Sun Microsystems in November 2003.  After  the take over, he became the Chief Technology Officer for Sun's data center automation division ("N1"). Schroepfer was the Vice President of engineering at Mozilla Corporation from July 2005 to August 2008,  where he led the development of the Firefox web browser.

He became director of engineering at Facebook in July 2008. In 2008 he was listed as number 20 in the 25 Most Influential People in Mobile Technology by Laptopmag.com. In 2010 Fortune listed him and two colleagues at Facebook's technical branch as joint number 27 in their list of the 40 under 40. Schroepfer has been known for his work on artificial intelligence at Facebook. Particularly, he gained attention amid the social media network's attempt to address the proliferation of false, misleading, and inappropriate content within the platform. It was reported that Mark Zuckerberg believes that Facebook can address the problem through its proprietary AI technology, which initially focused on greater facial recognition capability and better ad targeting. According to Schroepfer, Facebook's AI succeeded at certain types of content moderation. For example, its image classifier algorithms can automatically identify and delete photos and videos that contain nudity. 

Schroepfer became a member of the board of directors for Investment Management firm, Wealthfront, announced on November 16, 2015.

He lives in the San Francisco Bay Area.

On 23 September 2021, Mike Schroepfer announced that he would be stepping down from the role of CTO at Facebook next year.

See also
Facebook, Inc.
Criticism of Facebook

References

External links
Interview with Mike Schroepfer on a visit to Cambridge University, UK Anglia TV, Nov 19, 2010, Accessed Jan 2011. Mike Schroepfer explains the role he plays within Facebook's development and delivery and shares his ideas of the future.

Living people
Stanford University School of Engineering alumni
1975 births
Facebook employees
American software engineers
Mozilla people
American technology chief executives
21st-century American businesspeople
American technology company founders
20th-century American businesspeople